Dorstenia turnerifolia is a species of subshrub or herb in the family Moraceae which is native to eastern Brazil.

References

turnerifolia
Plants described in 1846
Flora of Brazil